Barbara George (16 August 1942 – 10 August 2006) was an American R&B singer and songwriter.

Biography
Born Barbara Ann Smith at Charity Hospital in New Orleans, Louisiana, United States, she was raised in the 9th ward New Orleans, and began singing in a church choir. She was discovered by singer Jessie Hill, who recommended her to record producer Harold Battiste.  Her first record on Battiste's AFO (All For One) record label, the certified gold single "I Know (You Don't Love Me No More)" (composed by her) was issued in late 1961 and topped the R&B chart and made number 3 on the Billboard Hot 100 chart.  It was later recorded by many other artists, including Freddie King, Paul Revere & the Raiders (1966), the Merseybeats, Ike and Tina Turner, and Bonnie Raitt (1972).

Her only album, 1961's I Know (You Don't Love Me No More) contains 12 tracks, 11 of which credit George as the writer.

Two subsequent self-penned singles, "You Talk About Love" (on AFO) and "Send For Me (If You Need Some Lovin')" (on Sue Records), reached the Billboard Hot 100 later in 1962, but failed to match the national success of her first hit.

Later recordings such as the 1979 Senator Jones produced "Take Me Somewhere Tonight", met with more limited success, and George largely retired from the music industry by the early 1980s, with subsequent singles never achieving the success of "I Know".  She sang on the Willy DeVille album Victory Mixture (1990).

George had three sons, Tevin, Albert, and Gregory.  Tevin trained as a professional boxer and is listed as the United States 1986 winner of the Golden Gloves award, subsequently going on to perform in the Olympic Trials.

George died in August 2006 in Chauvin, Louisiana, where she had spent the last ten years of her life, six days before her 64th birthday.

Charted singles

References

External links
  
 

1942 births
2006 deaths
African-American women songwriters
American rhythm and blues singer-songwriters
American soul musicians
Rhythm and blues musicians from New Orleans
Sue Records artists
Singer-songwriters from Louisiana
People from Terrebonne Parish, Louisiana
20th-century African-American women singers
21st-century American women